
Gmina Markuszów is a rural gmina (administrative district) in Puławy County, Lublin Voivodeship, in eastern Poland.

It is the smallest gmina in Puławy County in terms of area as well as population.

Villages
Gmina Markuszów contains the villages and settlements of Bobowiska, Góry, Kaleń, Kolonia Góry, Łany, Markuszów, Olempin, Olszowiec, Wólka Kątna and Zabłocie.

Demographics 
Population data as of December 31, 2011:

Neighbouring gminas
Gmina Markuszów is bordered by the gminas of Abramów, Garbów, Kurów and Nałęczów.

References

Markuszow
Puławy County